Dilnawaz Khan is an Indian politician and a member of the 16th Legislative Assembly of India. He represented the Syana constituency of Uttar Pradesh.

Early life and education
Dilnawaz Khan was born in Bulandshahar district.

Political career
Dilnawaz Khan has been a MLA for one term. He represented the Syana constituency. 
Dilnawaz Khan lost his Syana seat to his BJP rival Devendra Singh Lodhi by 71,630 votes.

Posts held

See also

 Syana (Assembly constituency)
 Sixteenth Legislative Assembly of Uttar Pradesh
 Uttar Pradesh Legislative Assembly

References

Indian National Congress politicians
Uttar Pradesh MLAs 2012–2017
People from Bulandshahr district
1977 births
Living people
Rashtriya Lok Dal politicians